NGC 956 is an asterism in the constellation Andromeda.

The object was found on December 23, 1831 by the British astronomer John Herschel, who originally believed the object to be an open cluster. However, an analysis in 2008 led to the conclusion that this "object" was merely a chance alignment of stars that only appear to be an open cluster.

References

External links 
 
 (English) NASA/IPAC Extragalactic Database
 (English) SEDS

0956
Andromeda (constellation)
Open clusters